Baranovka may refer to:
Baranovka, Russia, name of several rural localities in Russia
Baranivka (Baranovka), name of several inhabited localities in Ukraine